Diyatalawa (දියතලාව, meaning “the watered plain”) is a former garrison town in the central highlands of Sri Lanka, in the Badulla District of Uva Province. It is home to the Diyatalawa Garrison of the Sri Lanka Army, which includes the Sri Lanka Military Academy, officer training centre of the army; SLAF Diyatalawa, the Sri Lanka Air Force's ground combat training centre; and facilities of the Sri Lanka Police.

History
It is not known when Diyatalawa became a training station for troops, but available records show that it was selected around 1885, when the British Army first established a garrison at Diyatalawa. At that time training was conducted at the Imperial Camp which is now occupied by the Gemunu Watch troops. On 8 August 1900, the British War Office established a concentration camp in Diyatalawa to house Boer prisoners captured in the Second Boer War.  Constructed to house 2,500 prisoners and 1,000 guards and staff, the number of prisoners increased to 5,000. During World War I an internment camp for enemy aliens was set up.

Early in World War II the camp was reopened and German nationals resident in Hong Kong and Singapore were imprisoned there, together with a number of Buddhist monks of German extraction, such as Nyanaponika and Govinda Anagarika, who had acquired British citizenship. In June 1941 most of the sailors were transferred to Canada.  The section for Germans were divided into pro and anti-Nazi sections.  There was also a section set up to house Italian POWs. After the Japanese started bombing the island, inmates were transferred to camps in India for safety. Males usually went to Dehradun. Officer training was also carried out here during the war.

After World War II the Royal Navy maintained a rest station named HMS Uva, which were also sometimes used by RAF personnel, such as from RAF Negombo/Katunayake, and their families; the facilities were later taken over by the Royal Ceylon Navy in 1956, commissioning it as HMCYS Rangalla and established its training centre there. They had to move out in 1962 following the attempted coup d'état and it was taken over by the Gemunu Watch.

Sri Lanka gained its independence, as Ceylon, in 1948. In the mid-1950s, all British military facilities were transferred to the Sri Lankan services. In 1952 the Royal Ceylon Air Force established SLAF Diyatalawa.

Sporting events
Fox Hill, Diyatalawa is the venue for the annual Fox Hill Motor Cross organised by the Sri Lanka Military Academy, one of the premier motor racing events in the country.
	 	
Fox Hill (Nariya Kanda in Sinhalese) was named after the engraving of the whole slope facing the railway station of Diyatalawa, by the British soldiers at the canteen town, with an image of a fox carved in with hundreds of rough rocks of quartz that were once lying scattered all over the hill.  Stag Hill (Gona Kanda in Sinhalese) also named following the same style of rock art on hill similar to Fox Hill.

Climate
Due to the high altitude,the garrison town of Diyatalawa located between the hill station retreats of Haputale and Bandarawela of central highlands has a much cooler climate than the lowlands of Sri Lanka, with a mean annual temperature of 19 °C. In the winter months it is quite cold at night, and there can even be frost.

Maps
 Map of Diyatalawa

See also
 Sri Lanka Military Academy
 SLAF Diyatalawa
 Arcadia, Diyatalawa

References 

 
Hill stations in Sri Lanka
Military units and formations of Ceylon in World War II
Resorts in Sri Lanka
Towns in Badulla District
World War II sites in Sri Lanka